Kwon Min-sik (Hangul: 권민식, born February 26, 1994), known professionally as Sik-K (Hangul: 식케이), is a South Korean rapper. He first garnered attention when he appeared on Show Me the Money 4 in 2015.

Early life and education
Kwon Min-sik was born on February 26, 1994. Kwon attended Balsan Middle School and attended Dr. Charles Best Secondary School as a child and later majored in Management at Sejong University.

Private life 
Kwon enlisted in the army for his mandatory military enlistment on June 29, 2020.

Career 
In 2015, Sik-K appeared on Show Me the Money 4. He released his first EP, Flip, on July 20, 2016. In 2022, Sik-K left H1ghr Music as his contract expired.

Discography

Studio albums

Extended plays

Singles

Singles as a featured artist

Music videos

Official music videos

Other music video appearances

References

External links

1994 births
Living people
South Korean male rappers
South Korean hip hop singers
21st-century South Korean male singers